Sir Thomas Bell, KBE (21 December 1865 – 9 January 1952) was a British engineer and shipbuilder. He was a director of John Brown & Co. from 1903 to 1946.

References 

1865 births
1952 deaths
Knights Commander of the Order of the British Empire
British engineers
British shipbuilders
People educated at King's College School, London